Liechtenstein competed at the 2022 Winter Paralympics in Beijing, China which took place between 4–13 March 2022. One alpine skier competed.

Competitors
The following is the list of number of competitors participating at the Games per sport/discipline.

Alpine skiing

One alpine skier represented Liechtenstein.

See also
Liechtenstein at the Paralympics
Liechtenstein at the 2022 Winter Olympics

References

Nations at the 2022 Winter Paralympics
2022
Winter Paralympics